Shane Elizabeth Collins (born 25 July 1963 in Ranfurly, New Zealand) is a former field hockey player from New Zealand, who finished in eight position with the National Women's Field Hockey Team, nicknamed The Black Sticks, at the 1992 Summer Olympics in Barcelona.

After an illustrious career in the police, Collins is now undertaking research in the field of sport policy. Collins is still an elite sportswoman but has switched from hockey to marathon running in more recent years. Recent achievements include representing New Zealand in the Portuguese half marathon.

After several successful half marathons Collins has now turned her attention to triathlon.

References

External links
 

New Zealand female field hockey players
Olympic field hockey players of New Zealand
Field hockey players at the 1992 Summer Olympics
1963 births
Living people
People from Ranfurly, New Zealand